The 2021–22 season was the Saif SC's 6th season since its establishment in 2016 and their 5th consecutive season in the Bangladesh Premier League after promoting in 2017. The season cover period were from 1 October 2021 to 31 July 2022.

Season summary

October
On 11 October 2021 Nigerian forward Kenneth Ikechukwu has left the club to Indian club Churchill Brothers.
 
On 17 October 2021 the club has signed with Rwandian defender Emery Bayisenge from his countryside club AS Kigali.
 
On 18th October 2021 club signed with Nihat Jaman Uchhas on free transfer from Arambagh KS.
 
On 20 October 2021 forward Yeasin Arafat left the club to Bashundhara Kings.
 
On 22 October 2021 the club has confirmed signed Bangladesh Police FC midfielder Nazmul Islam Rasel on free transfer.

November
On 6 November 2021 Argentine Andres Cruciani has appointed as a head coach for the upcoming season.

On 7 November 2021 Nigerian forward Mfon Udoh has signed from Nigerian top division club Akwa United to Saif SC.

On 28 November 2021 Saif Sporting Club has started their 2021-22 football season by defeated 2–1 goals Bangladesh Army. A goal from Nigerian forward Emeka Ogbugh and 1 own goal from Bangladesh Army defender Mehedi Hasan Mithu ensure the victory of the match.

December
On 2 December Saif Sporting Club defeated 3–2 goals Muktijoddha Sangsad KC. In 17 minutes goal by Foysal Ahmed Fahim and Nasirul Islam in 40 minutes finished 2-0 half time scored. In the second half 81 minutes third goals by Sazzad Hossain make score line 3-0 but in the 85, 90 minutes two goals by Tetsuaki Misawi finished the game 3–2.

On 6 December Saif Sporting drew against Dhaka Mohammedan 1–1 goals. In the 45 minutes first half Saif forward Mfon Udoh goal took lead. In second half 90+1 minutes Mohammedan SC defender Rajib Hossain goal level the scored. Two win one draw with 7 points Saif SC through to the Knockout stage.

On 10 December Saif Sporting Club defeated Swadhinata KS by 2–0 goals in their second Semi-finals. First half and second half both teams players played tough football but they won't found goal. End of 90 minutes goalless referee add 30 minutes first minute of extra time on 91 minutes Maraz Hossain goal took lead Saif Sporting Club and second one on 99 minutes by Foysal Ahmed Fahim. As a result this match Saif Sporting Club reached Semi-final.

On 14 December Saif Sporting Club defeated to Dhaka Abahani by 0–2 goals. On 25 minutes Nabib Newaj Jibon scored for Dhaka Abahani and with a goal finished first half. In the second half 81 minutes goal by Daniel Colindres made it 2–0. Saif Sporting Club exited from the tournament.

On 26 December Saif SC 1–1 draw versus Bangladesh Police FC. On 55 minutes Saif defender Emery Bayisenge penalty goal took lead Saif SC but in the additional time 90+2 minutes goals by Police FC Amredin Sharifi draw the match and both teams share point.

On 30 December Saif Sporting Club won 2–1 goals against Chittagong Abahani. Goals on 34 minutes Maraz Hosain and 38 Uzbekistan forward Asor Gafurov SSC end first half. In the second half 81 minutes Chittagong Abahani Shakhawat Hossain Rony scored a goal but isn't enough to avoid lost the match.

January
On 2 January Saif Sporting club won by 2–0 against Swadhinata KS. On 40 minutes of first half Rahim Uddin open account for Saif SC before break of half time. In the second half 71 minutes Maraz Hossain made the scored 2–0 and Saif SC with 3 points qualified to Semi-finals.

On 6 January Saif Sporting Club lost 3(3)–3(4) penalties shoot out against Dhaka Abahani. On 10 minutes first half Raphael Augusto gave lead Dhaka  Abahani but Mfon Udoh equalized score on 19 minutes and finished half time 1–1. In the second half 74 minutes Emeka Ogbugh made score 2–1 until 90 minutes and Saif about to through the final but on 90+3 minutes Daniel Colindres goal level the score 2–2. In the extra time 90+4 minutes Rakib Hossain goal again Abahani took lead but on 120+3 minutes Saif SC Sazzad Hossain draw the scoreline 3–3. In the penalties shoot out Dhaka Abahani won 4–3 and through to the Final.

February
On 4 February Saif Sporting Club has meet season first home match against Bangladesh Police FC and won by 1–0 goal. Both team in the first half has played goalless. In the second half regulations times ended 0–0 but in the additional time on 90+2 minutes Saif SC Rwandian defender Emery Bayisenge goal gave them 3 points and left the field with victory.

On 9 February Saif Sporting Club has meet their away game versus Rahmatganj MFS and lost by 3–1 goals. In the first half on 16 minutes a goal by Foysal Ahmed Fahim and on 40 minutes a goal by Nigerian Emeka Ogbugh took lead before ended of half time. In the second half on 66 minutes a goal by Maraz Hossain Saif SC made the scoreline 0–3. After conceded 3 goals Rahmatganj MFS playing attacking football and on 71 minutes a goal scored by Rahmatganj MFS Nigerian forward Sunday Chizoba made score  1–3 until finished the game.

On 13 February Saif Sporting Club lost by 0–1 goal at home against Sheikh Russel KC.
 In the first half on 39 minutes a penalty goal by defender Aizar Akmatov took lead and finished half time. In the second half Sheikh Russel KC tried to extended the lead but Saif Sports Club also tried to equalized score but they won't able to do it. Sheikh Russel KC have left the field with full three  points.

On 17 February Saif Sporting Club have lost home game 0–2 against Dhaka Mohammedan. In the first half on 32 minutes a goal by Souleymane Diabate took the lead Dhaka Mohammedan and hold the lead till end first halftime. In the second half in between 4 minutes a goal by Md Shahriar Emon Dhaka Mohammdan extended the lead  2–0. Rest of the time of second half Saif Sporting Club didn't able to score any goal and Dhaka Mohammdan got three points.

On 24 February Saif Sporting Club drew 3–3 goals against Chittagong Abahani at home match. In the first half on 5 minutes Sazzad Hossain goal take early lead Saif Sporting Club and in the added time of first half on 45+3 Peter Ebimobowei goal equalized score 1–1. In the second half on 58 minutes penalty goal by Emeka Ogbugh took lead again with score 2–1 but on 67 minutes goal by Chittgong Abahani Peter Ebimobowei leveled the score 2–2. On the 80 minutes second penalty goal by Emeka Ogbugh made scoreline 3–2 but Saif SC couldn't hold the lead till end the match because of Peter Ebimobowei third goal of the match ended match 3–3.

March
On 1 March Saif Sporting Club defeated 5–1 goals Swadhinata KS in the away game.

On 16 March Saif Sporting Club defeated to Bashundhara Kings by 3–4 goals in the away game.

April
On 3 April Saif Sporting Club won by 3–0 goals against Uttar Baridhara Club at home ground. In the first half on 12 minutes Mfon Udoh goal took lead Saif Sporting Club and before last whistle of halftime on 45+1 minutes goal by Asor Gafurov extended it to 2–0. In the second half on 67 Sazzad Hossain Shakil goals made score 3–0 goals. On 87 minutes shown red card Saif Sporting Club Nasirul Islam Nasir and Yassan Kochnov of Uttar Baridhara Club. Both teams rest of the time played with ten men's squad.

On 8 April Saif Sporting Club drew against Muktijoddha Sangsad KC by 3–3 in the away game.

On 21 April Saif Sporting Club have appointed Sheikh Maruf Hasan their new managing director. Sheikh Maruf Hasan former BFF counselor & competitor also Police officer.

On 29 April Saif Sporting Club beat Rahmatganj MFS with score 4–2 at home venue.

May
On 7 May Saif Sporting Club have won by 1–0 goal against Sheikh Russel KC in the away game.

On 12 May Saif Sporting Club have won against Dhaka Mohammedan with score 1–3 at home.

June
On 23 June Saif Sporting Club have won against Chittagong Abahani by 4–3 goals in the away game.

On 28 June Saif Sporting Club have lost by 1–2 goals against Swadhinata KS at home ground.

July
On 3 July Saif Sporting Club have won by 4–2 goals versus Dhaka Abahani at home ground.

On 8 July Saif Sporting Club have drawn against Sheikh Jamal DC by 2–2 goals in the away game.

On 18 July Saif Sporting Club have lost against Bashundhara Kings by 0–2 goals at home venue.

On 26 July Saif Sporting Club have won versus Uttar Baridhara Club by 7–0 goals in the away game.

On 31 July Saif Sporting Club have lost against Muktijoddha Sangsad  KC by 2–3 goals at home ground.

Current squad
Saif Sporting Club Limited squad for 2021–22 season.

Pre-season and friendlies

Transfer

Out

In

Competitions

Overall

Overview

Independence Cup

Group stages

Group C

Knockout stage

Federation Cup

Group stages

Group C

Knockout stage

Premier League

League table

Results summary

Results by round

Matches

Statistics

Goalscorers

Source: Matches

References

Saif SC

Football clubs in Bangladesh
2022 in Bangladeshi football
2021 in Bangladeshi football